is a Japanese anime series based on the 1972 eponymous novel,  by Atsuo Saitō and directed by Osamu Dezaki. Its 26 episodes were broadcast on Nippon TV between April 7, 1975 and September 29, 1975 and was animated by Tokyo Movie Shinsha and Madhouse. The first movie, a compilation feature returning to the title of the book the series was based on, was released March 4, 1984 and was animated by Tokyo Movie Shinsha. The series has been adapted into a film, titled , which was released in Japan on July 20, 1991 and again was animated by TMS. On March 4, 2003 Bandai released a puzzle and action PlayStation game called Gamba no Bouken: The Puzzle Action.

A 3D CG animated film adaptation was released in Japan on October 10, 2015, titled , which was later released in the United States by Lionsgate and Grindstone Entertainment Group in 2017 that changed many character names under the title Air Bound. Prior to this, an English version was produced by SC Films International under the name Gamba 3D, and without character name changes.

Plot 
Gamba, a brown mouse, embarks on a sailing journey with his childhood friend. They gather experienced mice sailors at a harbour. They encounter Chūta, a mouse who has been injured and is seeking help. He appeals for Gamba and Bōbo to assist him in defending the island of Yumemishima and its inhabitants from the cruel and wicked invading Noroi Clan. Gamba elects to sail to Yumemishima with Chūta to help defend the island, and Gamba recruits more mice to join their cause on the island.

Characters 
 
 The town mouse, who calls himself . He is always energetic, full of curiosity, and has a strong sense of justice. He takes a trip to show the sea to his close friend Bōbo, and meets Chūta at the harbor when they arrive. Gamba and his friends are out on a journey to heed the wishes of Chūta, to defeat Noroi who rules Noroi Island. He is renamed Gavin in Lionsgate's English film dub.

 
 The Gamba's best friend. He is a gluttonous, green-furred and an easygoing town mouse. His name is the result of him being absentminded. His sensitive nose helps him to find food. He is made into a secondary character in the 2015 film.

 
 A mouse who appears only in the 2015 film. He takes on Bobo's original role from the 70s anime. He is renamed Matthew in Lionsgate's English film dub.

 
 The kind-hearted captain of sailor mice. He has a daughter named Yuri, is very dependable and is calmer than Gamba. He lost his right eye to Noroi. He is renamed Rusty in Lionsgate's English film dub.

 
 One of Yoisho's childhood friends. He is knowledgeable, clever, wears big glasses and has quite a short tail. He is renamed Grayson in Lionsgate's English film dub.

 
 The wandering doctor mouse. Every time he gets drunk, he reads poetry out loud. He also has sensitive ears that pick up sound the other mice cannot hear.

 
 He is a gambler and good at fraud. He is also called a "swift runner" because he is light-footed. He is renamed Ace in Lionsgate's English film dub.

 
 An insular mouse who comes to the town for help. He is a younger brother of Shioji. He is renamed Chester in Lionsgate's English film dub.

 
 The leader weasel with snow-white fur and red eyes. He is a cruel and bloodthirsty killer and when his red eyes shine eerily in the dark, he can apply hypnotism. He is renamed Winston in Lionsgate's English film dub.

 
 The granddaughter of the elder mouse Shuro from Yumemishima, and is an older sister of Chūta. She is renamed Shelly in Lionsgate's English film dub.

 
 The traveler mouse who is on his way home from a ten year trip. He uses Gamba to avoid danger. He is modeled on Torajirō of "Otoko wa Tsurai yo."

 
 The head of the streaked shearwaters. All of his subordinates, his wives, and his eggs were slaughtered by Noroi. Tsuburi is depicted as female in the film, and she is renamed Theresa in Lionsgate's English dub.

Voice casts

TV show

2015 film 

Additional voices:

 English (Lionsgate/ Bang Zoom! Entertainment): Amanda Celine Miller, Chris Hackney, Damien Haas, Dave Mallow, David W. Collins, Dorah Fine, Dorothy Elias-Fahn, Doug Stone, Erika Harlacher, Janice Kawaye, Jason Linere White, Jay Preston, Joseph J. Thomas, Kaiji Tang, Katelyn Gault, Keith Silverstein, Kyle Hebert, Lex Lang, Mark Whiten, Philece Sampler, Vernon Dew, Zeno Robinson

Episode listing

Music

Opening theme 
"Gamba no uta" (The Gamba Song)
Lyrics – Tokyo Movie Planning Department
Composition / Arrangement – Takeo Yamashita
Singer – Sabu Kawahara

Ending theme  
"Boukenshatachi no Ballad" (The Ballad of the Adventurer)
Lyrics – Tokyo Movie Planning Department
Composition / Arrangement – Takeo Yamashita
Singer – Yoshihiro Sugiura

Insert song 
"Hayasegawa no Uta" (Hayasegawa's Song)
Lyrics – Atsuo Saitō
Composition / Arrangement – Takeo Yamashita
Singer – Kōko Kagawa (Episode 1), Kazuko Yanaga (Episode 21 & 25)

"Kaze no Sekai" (Windy World)
Lyrics / Composition – Taeko Onuki
Arrangement – Tatsuro Yamashita
Singer – 
This song is played on episode 15 when the man in the mountain hut turns on the radio.

Reception 
In a 2006 poll of Japanese celebrities conducted by TV Asahi, Gamba no Bouken was ranked as respondents' 22nd favorite TV anime out of 100, beating many other series including: One Piece, Naruto, Pokémon, Evangelion, and Fullmetal Alchemist. In 2013, anime director Kenji Kamiyama, most known for the Ghost in the Shell: Stand Alone Complex series, cited the original anime among the 15 best anime of all time.

References

External links 
 Official TMS Entertainment Gamba no Bōken website 
 Official Tokyo MX Gamba no Bōken website 
 
 
 
 
 

1975 anime television series debuts
1991 anime films
2015 anime films
Adventure anime and manga
Japanese animated films
PlayStation (console) games
Puzzle video games
Shirogumi
TMS Entertainment